S. lateralis  may refer to:
 Scincella lateralis, the little brown skink or ground skink, a small skink species  found throughout much of the eastern half of the United States and into northern Mexico
 Spermophilus lateralis, the golden-mantled ground squirrel, a mammal species found across North America

See also
 Lateralis (disambiguation)